This is a list of notable people from Mozambique.

Filmmakers
Rogério Manjate, actor, writer and film director

Musicians
Eldevina Materula, oboist and music teacher

Politicians
Esperança Bias, former Minister of Mineral Resources
Joaquim Chissano, first Prime Minister of Mozambique 
Josina Machel, political activist and first wife of Samora Machel
Graca Machel, political activist and second wife of Samora Machel
Samora Machel, first President of Mozambique
Alberto Massavanhane, first Mayor of Maputo and Mozambican Diplomat
Eduardo Mondlane, founder and first president of FRELIMO
Janet Mondlane, anti-apartheid activist and wife to Eduardo Mondlane
Francisco Songane, Minister of Health

Sportspeople
Maria Mutola, world and Olympic track and field athlete winner

Writers
Mia Couto
Tânia Tomé

See also
 Lists of people by nationality - similar lists for other countries